Dilution may refer to:
 Reducing the concentration of a chemical
 Serial dilution, a common way of going about this reduction of concentration
 Homeopathic dilution
 Dilution (equation), an equation to calculate the rate a gas dilutes
Trademark dilution, a type of unlawful trademark use outside of the relevant market
Stock dilution, the result of new shares of stock being issued by a company, thereby diminishing the percent ownership represented by previously existing shares
Dilution gene, a gene that lightens the coat color of certain living things
 Expectational Dilution, the second album by the metalcore band Overcast
 Dilution ratio
 Hemodynamics#Hemodilution, in blood

See also
 Dilation (disambiguation)

zh:稀释
nl:Verdunning